Charles Gautier de Vinfrais, better known under the name Vinfrais l'ainé, (7 November 1704 – 4 Novembre 1797) was an 18th-century French officer of the Royal venery.

Long a huntsman of King Louis XV of France with whom he hunted regularly, Vinfrais wrote the article Vénerie for the 16th volume of the Encyclopédie, comprehensive on the organization and history of Royal Hunts, informative, but poorly organized, absolutely devoid of any critical spirit and silent on the social costs of hunting on the peasantry of his time.

Bibliography 
 Eugène Chapus, Les Chasses princières en France de 1589 à 1841, Hunting, 1853
 Jules Henri D. de Tardy, Le Particule nobiliaire,
 Annie Becq, L'Encyclopédisme - Actes Du Colloque de Caen, 12–16 January 1987

External links 
 Article Vénerie in the Encyclopédie
 Charles Gautier de Vinfrais on Wikisource
 Généalogie de la famille Gautier de Vinfrais
 Certificate marriage of Vinfray

People of the Ancien Régime
People from Saint-Germain-en-Laye
Contributors to the Encyclopédie (1751–1772)
1704 births
1797 deaths